RQM or rqm may refer to:

 Relational quantum mechanics, an interpretation of quantum mechanics
 Relativistic quantum mechanics, a theory in quantum mechanics
 Rekem, a former name of the archaeological city Petra
 Regimental quartermaster, a type of military quartermaster